Seghouane District is a district of Médéa Province, Algeria.

The district is further divided into 4 municipalities:
Seghouane
Zoubiria
Medjebar
Tlatet Eddouair

Districts of Médéa Province